The Sikorski–Mayski agreement was a treaty between the Soviet Union and Poland that was signed in London on 30 July 1941. Its name is taken from its two most notable signatories: the prime minister of Poland, Władysław Sikorski, and the Soviet ambassador to the United Kingdom, Ivan Mayski.

Background 
After signing the Molotov-Ribbentrop Pact in 1939, the Soviets invaded Poland and took part in its dismemberment. The Soviet authorities declared Poland to be nonexistent, and all former Polish citizens from the areas annexed by the Soviet Union were treated as Soviet citizens. That resulted in the arrest and imprisonment of approximately 2 million Polish citizens (including a quarter of a million prisoners-of-war and 1.5 million deportees) by the NKVD and other Soviet authorities.

Negotiations 
When the international situation changed in 1941 with Operation Barbarossa, the German invasion of the Soviet Union in 1941, the Soviet leader Joseph Stalin began to seek help from other countries opposing Germany. Strongly encouraged by British Foreign Secretary Anthony Eden, Sikorski on 5 July 1941 opened negotiations with the Soviet ambassador to London, Ivan Mayski, to re-establish diplomatic relations between Poland and the Soviet Union. Sikorski was the architect of the agreement reached by both governments that was signed on 30 July 1941. A further military alliance was signed in Moscow on 14 August 1941. Later that year, Sikorski went to Moscow with a diplomatic mission (including the future Polish ambassador to Moscow, Stanisław Kot, and the chief of the Polish Military Mission in the Soviet Union, General Zygmunt Szyszko-Bohusz).

Provisions 
Stalin agreed to declare all previous pacts that he had with Nazi Germany null and void, to invalidate the September 1939 partition of Poland and to release tens of thousands of Polish prisoners-of-war held in Soviet camps. Pursuant to an agreement between the Polish government-in-exile and Stalin, the Soviets granted "amnesty" to many Polish citizens on 12 August 1941, from whom a 40,000-strong army (Anders Army, later known as the Polish II Corps) was formed under General Władysław Anders. The whereabouts of thousands more Polish officers, however, would remain unknown for two more years and weigh heavily on subsequent Polish-Soviet relations.

See also
 Territories of Poland annexed by the Soviet Union
 Polish contribution to World War II

References

External links
  Text of the treaty
  Polish-Soviet Union Agreements : July 30, 1941

1941 in the Soviet Union
1941 in Poland
July 1941 events
Military alliances involving the Soviet Union
Military alliances involving Poland
World War II treaties
20th-century military alliances
Treaties concluded in 1941
Treaties of the Second Polish Republic
Treaties of the Soviet Union
Anthony Eden